The 1971 World Table Tennis Championships men's doubles was the 31st edition of the men's doubles championship. 

István Jónyer and Tibor Klampár won the title after defeating Chuang Tse-tung and Liang Ko-liang in the final by three sets to one.

Results

See also
List of World Table Tennis Championships medalists

References

-